This page features the teams that played at the 2015 SEABA Championship in Singapore. The list names the players for their respective participation in their National Basketball teams during the championship, including Philippines, Malaysia, Singapore, Indonesia, Laos and Brunei.

Brunei

Indonesia

Laos

|}
| valign="top" |
Head coach
S. Wei
Assistant coaches

Legend
Club – describes lastclub before the tournament
Age – describes ageon 27 April 2015
|}

Malaysia

Philippines

Singapore

squads